Dalia Fadila (b.1973) is an Arab-Israeli educator. She developed a new curriculum, textbooks and Q schools in Israel and Jordan, which are designed to teach English to Arab schoolchildren.

Early life
Fadila was born in Tira, a border village in the Triangle on the Israeli side of the Green Line separating that country from the West Bank. Her father was the principal educator there, and she grew up in a progressive household. In reaction to the conservative temperament of her wider village environment, she became a feminist and explored the Arabic language literary genre of feminism, only to find it disappointing.

She earned a B.A, a master's in female minority literature and a PhD on the works of the Jordanian-American writer Diana Abu-Jaber, all  from Ramat Gan's Bar Ilan University. While completing her first two degrees, she taught English literature at her former high school in Tira for three years. Her teaching ended after three years because her parents complained of the values she instilled in the students.

Career 
The Israeli Ministry of Education suggested she take up a teaching position in Baqa al-Gharbiyye near Haifa, at the Al-Qasemi Academic College of Education. Beginning in 2002, her coursework there included D. H. Lawrence's The Horse Dealer's Daughter, and Alice Walker's Everyday Use. Initially, both teaching staff and students complained that these coming-of-age stories threatened Islamic morals. Her appointment as head of the English Department helped the Qasami Academy secure accreditation as an officially recognized Israeli college. After presiding as dean of the college of over 4,000 students for a year during the chairman's sabbatical, against considerable resistance from male staff, she was appointed head of al-Qasemi's faculty of engineering. During her tenure, the academy raised its enrolment from 100 to 1,000 students, including Jewish community members.

She opened the first of what became a network of private Q schools in Tira in 2008, and by 2016 she had created similar institutions in Nazareth, Jaljulia, Tayibe, East Jerusalem, Ramallah in the West Bank and, in 2012, in the Jordanian capital of Amman. A Ted talk she gave on identity and education caught the attention of Jordanian educators who invited her to set up a school in Amman. Within a decade, her 5 schools had been attended by over 2,000 students. Many American Jewish communities, impressed by her work, have funded scholarships for her poorer students.

Views
For societies that host multiple ethnic and cultural identities, accepting the complexities of one's heritage is important. Fadila claimed that one problem facing Arabs in Israel is that they live in "ambivalent chaos" as Palestinian, Muslim, Arab, and Israeli.  They must, she thinks, begin to grasp the need, as is the case among the United States' minorities, to hyphenate their identities.

Personal life
Fadila's husband Abed is a trauma coordinator at a hospital in Kfar Saba.

Notes

Citations

Sources

1973 births
Arab citizens of Israel
Bar-Ilan University alumni
Living people